The Government of Uttar Pradesh (ISO: Uttar Pradesh Sarkār; often abbreviated as GoUP) is the subnational government of the Indian state of Uttar Pradesh with the governor as its appointed constitutional head of the state by the President of India. The Governor of Uttar Pradesh is appointed for a period of five years and appoints the Chief Minister of Uttar Pradesh and their council of ministers, who are vested with the executive powers of the state. The governor remains a ceremonial head of the state, while the chief minister and their council are responsible for day-to-day government functions. 

The state of Uttar Pradesh's influence on Indian politics is important, and often paramount and/or a bellwether, as it sends the most members of parliament to both the Lok Sabha and the Rajya Sabha, the state's population being more than 200 million; approximately double that of the next-most populous state.

Legislature

The state is governed by a parliamentary system of representative democracy. Uttar Pradesh is one of the seven states in India, where the state legislature is bicameral, comprising two houses: the Vidhan Sabha (legislative assembly) and the Vidhan Parishad (legislative council). The Uttar Pradesh Legislative Assembly consists of 404 members who are elected for five-year terms. The Uttar Pradesh Legislative Council is a permanent body of 100 members with one-third (33 members) retiring every two years. Since Uttar Pradesh sends the most legislators to the national Parliament, it is often considered to be one of the most important states with respect to Indian politics. The state contributes 80 seats to the lower house of the Parliament of India, the Lok Sabha and 31 seats to the upper house, the Rajya Sabha.

Executive
The government is headed by the governor who appoints the chief minister and their council of ministers. The governor is appointed for a period of five years and acts as the constitutional head of the state. The governor remains the ceremonial head of the state with the day-to-day running of the government is taken care of by the chief minister and their council of ministers in whom a great deal of legislative powers is vested.

The council of ministers consists of cabinet ministers and ministers of state. The Secretariat headed by the chief secretary assists the council of ministers. The chief secretary is also the administrative head of the government.

Each government department is headed by a Minister, who is assisted by an additional chief secretary or a principal secretary, who usually is an officer of Indian Administrative Service, the additional chief secretary or principal secretary serves as the administrative head of the department they are assigned to. Each department also has officers of the rank of secretary, special secretary, joint secretary etc. assisting the minister and the additional chief secretary or principal secretary.

Council of ministers

Judiciary

The judiciary in the state consists of the Allahabad High Court in Allahabad, the Lucknow Bench of Allahabad High Court, district courts and session courts in each district or Sessions Division, and lower courts at the tehsil level. The President of India appoints the chief justice of the High Court of the Uttar Pradesh judiciary on the advice of the Chief Justice of the Supreme Court of India as well as the Governor of Uttar Pradesh. Other judges are appointed by the President of India on the advice of the Chief Justice of the High Court. Subordinate Judicial Service, categorized into two divisions viz. Uttar Pradesh civil judicial services and Uttar Pradesh higher judicial service is another vital part of the judiciary of Uttar Pradesh. While the Uttar Pradesh civil judicial services comprise the Civil Judges (Junior Division)/Judicial Magistrates and civil judges (Senior Division)/Chief Judicial Magistrate, the Uttar Pradesh higher judicial service comprises civil and sessions judges. The Subordinate Judicial Service (viz. The district court of Etawah and the district court of Kanpur Dehat) of the judiciary at Uttar Pradesh is controlled by the District Judge.

Administration

Divisional administration 
The Indian state of Uttar Pradesh is made up of 75 administrative districts, that are grouped into 18 divisions. Each division consists of 3-7 districts. A divisional commissioner, an officer of the Indian Administrative Service (IAS) is responsible for heading the administration of a division, the Divisional minister is also responsible for the collection of revenue and maintenance of law and order in their division.

There are also eight police zones and eighteen police ranges in the state. Each zone consists of 2-3 ranges and is headed by an additional director general-ranked officer of the Indian Police Service (IPS). Whereas a range consists of three to four districts and is headed by an inspector general-ranked or a deputy inspector general-ranked IPS officer.

District administration
A district of an Indian state is an administrative geographical unit, headed by a district magistrate and collector (DM), an IAS officer. The district magistrate is responsible for coordinating the work between various departments in the district, is responsible for law and order in the district and is also given the power of an executive magistrate. The DM is assisted by a number of officers belonging to the Provincial Civil Service and other state services.

A senior superintendent of police or superintendent of police, a gazetted officer (PPS or IPS in case of SP and IPS in case of SSP) of Uttar Pradesh Cadre, is entrusted with the responsibility of maintaining law and order and related issues of the district. The superintendent is assisted by other junior to SSP/SP rank IPS and PPS gazetted officers in addition to Uttar Pradesh Police non-gazetted officials.

A divisional forest officer, an officer belonging to the Indian Forest Service, in the rank of deputy conservator of forests, is responsible for managing the forests, the environment, and wildlife-related issues of the district with the assistance of the Uttar Pradesh Forest Service.

Sectoral development is looked after by the district head of each development department such as public works, health, education, agriculture, animal husbandry, etc. These officers belong to the various state services. These officers have to report to the DM of the district.

Politics
The politics of Uttar Pradesh is dominated by the Bharatiya Janata Party, Samajwadi Party, Indian National Congress and the Bahujan Samaj Party. The Bharatiya Janata Party occupies the current government headed by Chief Minister Yogi Adityanath.

See also
 List of governors of Uttar Pradesh
 List of chief ministers of Uttar Pradesh

References

Bibliography

External links

 

 
1829 establishments in India